Earl Haley (born 19 May 1959) is a Guyanese sprinter. He competed in the men's 100 metres at the 1984 Summer Olympics.

References

1959 births
Living people
Athletes (track and field) at the 1984 Summer Olympics
Guyanese male sprinters
Olympic athletes of Guyana
World Athletics Championships athletes for Guyana
Place of birth missing (living people)